Ramon Luis Valcárcel Siso (born November 16, 1954) is a Spanish politician and Member of the European Parliament from Spain. He has served as President of the Autonomous Community of the Region of Murcia from 1995 to 2014, and former president of the Committee of the Regions (CoR) of the European Union.

Political career (1982-1995)

Member of the European Parliament, 2014–present
Valcárcel has since been serving as Vice-President of the European Parliament and a member of its Committee on Regional Development. In his capacity as vice-president, he is also in charge of overseeing the parliament's research service and library; relations with national parliaments; and relations with the  Committee of the Regions and the European Economic and Social Committee.

In 2015, news media reported that Valcárcel was included in a Russian blacklist of prominent people from the European Union who are not allowed to enter the country.

References

1954 births
Living people
Presidents of the Region of Murcia
Members of the Regional Assembly of Murcia
People's Party (Spain) politicians
People's Alliance (Spain) politicians
Politicians from the Region of Murcia
MEPs for Spain 2014–2019
Presidents of the European Committee of the Regions